Mahizan-e Sofla (also Romanized as Māhīzān-e Soflá; also known as Māhizān) is a village in Helilan Rural District, Helilan District, Chardavol County, Ilam Province, Iran. At the 2006 census, its population was 270, in 57 families. The village is populated by Kurds.

References 

Populated places in Chardavol County
Kurdish settlements in Ilam Province